Route 130 is a mostly north/south provincial highway in the Canadian province of New Brunswick. The road has a length of approximately 108 kilometres, and services small, otherwise isolated rural communities. In these areas, the highway is often unofficially referred to as "Main Street." The highway is known as Broadway and Portage Road in Grand Falls, and West Riverside Drive in Perth-Andover.

History

Route 130 was created in 1965 as a short spur from the Trans-Canada Highway into Grand Falls. When a new 4-lane TCH was opened in 2007, the route was extended by over 95 km south from Grand Falls along the former TCH to Aroostook, along a formerly unnumbered route (part of the original Route 2 until the 1960s) from Aroostook to Perth-Andover, the former TCH again from Perth-Andover to Somerville (near Hartland), and a new access road that meets up with the new highway at Waterville.

Major intersections

Communities along the Route
 Grand Falls
 Grand Falls Portage
 Lower Portage
 Four Falls
 Aroostook
 Aroostook Junction
 Perth-Andover
 Hillandale
 Beaconsfield
 Bairdsville
 River de Chute
 Clearview
 Upper Wicklow
 Wicklow
 Florenceville
 Riverbank
 Stickney
 Lansdowne
 Upper Brighton
 Somerville
 Waterville

See also
List of New Brunswick provincial highways

References

Grand Falls, New Brunswick
130
130
130
Former segments of the Trans-Canada Highway